Kanaipur is a Union located in Faridpur Sadar Upazila, Faridpur District, Dhaka Division, Bangladesh. Though being outside the city, it is relatively developed. The Magura-Faridpur Highway, a part of the Dhaka-Khulna Highway runs through the Union.
Populated places in Dhaka Division